Thiess is a north German name originating from the given name Matthias. It may refer to
Dorothea Thiess (1897–1973), German stage, film and television actress
 Frank Thiess (1890–1977),  German writer
Leslie Thiess (1909–1992), Australian construction and mining entrepreneur
 Ursula Thiess (1924–2010), German film actress

References

German-language surnames
Surnames from given names